This is a list of Croatian European Film Award winners and nominees. This list details the performances of Croatian actors, actresses, and films that have either been submitted or nominated for, or have won, a European Film Award including Croatian co-productions.

Main categories

See also
 List of Croatian submissions for the Academy Award for Best Foreign Language Film

External links
 Nominees and winners at the European Film Academy website

European Film Award winners
European Film Academy Awards
European Film Award winners